Bagh Darreh (also Romanized as Bāgh Darreh; also known as Bag-Darrekh) is a village in Khorramdarreh Rural District, in the Central District of Khorramdarreh County, Zanjan Province, Iran. At the 2006 census, its population was 294, in 61 families.

References 

Populated places in Khorramdarreh County